Uriah (or Urijah in some older English translations) is a prophet and martyr mentioned in the Book of Jeremiah.

Biblical narrative 
He is described as being the son of Shemaiah from Kiriath-Jearim. During the reign of Jehoiakim, king of Judah, he fled into Egypt from the cruelty of the king, but having been brought back he was beheaded and his body "cast into the graves of the common people."

Lachish Letters 
While it is not certain, there is a scholarly opinion that Uriah might be referenced in the Lachish letters. See Lachish letters.

References 

Biblical murder victims
Book of Jeremiah
Deaths by decapitation
Male murder victims